The 2000 Acclaim Mosconi Cup, the seventh edition of the annual nine-ball pool competition between teams representing Europe and the United States, took place 14–17 December 2000 at the York Hall in Bethnal Green, London, England.

Team USA won the Mosconi Cup by defeating Team Europe 12–9.


Teams

Results

Thursday, 14 December

Session 1

Friday, 15 December

Session 2

Session 3

Saturday, 16 December

Session 4

Session 5

Sunday, 17 December

Session 6

Session 7

References

External links
 Official homepage

2000
2000 in cue sports
2000 sports events in London
Sport in the London Borough of Tower Hamlets
2000 in English sport
December 2000 sports events in the United Kingdom